Kateryna Anatoliivna Pavlenko (born August 10, 1988), also known as Monokate, is a Ukrainian singer, composer, and folklorist. She is the lead vocalist of the Ukrainian electro-folk band Go_A, who represented Ukraine at Eurovision Song Contest 2020 with their song "Solovey". After the cancellation of the contest due to the COVID-19 pandemic, they represented Ukraine again in 2021 with "Shum".

Early life
Pavlenko was born on August 10, 1988, in Nizhyn, Chernihiv Oblast, Ukraine, (at the time it was the Ukrainian SSR) a city north-east of the capital Kyiv. Her mother worked an unpaid job in the military which meant her family was poor and, at one point, homeless. She was surrounded by folk music from an early age. Her grandmother was a singer and taught her the traditional style of singing known as 'white voice' and her grandfather played the accordion. Her mother also sang in a folk choir. 

During her time at school she studied singing and was encouraged by her teachers to become an opera singer, however she realised she wanted to become a rock musician. She was in a local rock band as a teen and performed in several concerts.

Education
Pavlenko studied at the Nizhyn School of Culture and Arts, graduating in 2009. She then went on to study folklore at the Kyiv National University of Culture and Arts, graduating in 2013.

Career
Pavlenko has directed multiple folk ensembles, including the veterans choir in Berezan, Kyiv Oblast. She is the lead singer of the band Go_A, and has written and published her own music under her pseudonym, Monokate.

Recognition

In June 2021, Kateryna Pavlenko entered the top 100 most influential women in Ukraine according to Focus magazine, where she took 10th place.

Go_A
Pavlenko originally joined the electro-folk band Go_A as a backup singer in 2012, but she is now the lead singer. Their first single, "Koliada", came out in 2012, but the band didn't gain much recognition until 2015, when they released "Vesnyanka", which was number one in the 10Dance chart of the Ukrainian Kiss FM radio station, and was elected 'discovery of the year' by the same radio station. Their debut album Idy Na Zvuk was released in 2016.

Eurovision Song Contest 
In early 2020, Pavlenko, along with the band, competed in Vidbir 2020, the Ukrainian National Selection for the Eurovision Song Contest 2020 with the song "Solovey". In the final, they won both the jury and televote which meant they would represent Ukraine at Eurovision 2020 but due to the COVID-19 pandemic, the competition was cancelled. 

Go_A represented Ukraine the next year at Eurovision 2021 with the song "Shum". They placed 5th overall, but came 2nd in the public vote. "Shum" reached 1st place in the global Spotify Viral 50 on May 24.

Pavlenko was also the Ukrainian jury spokesperson at the Eurovision Song Contest 2022. She awarded the United Kingdom their first twelve-point vote since 2017.

Discography

With Go_A

Albums

Singles

As Monokate

Singles

Eurovision Song Contest entrants for Ukraine

References 

Folktronica musicians
Electronic musicians
Ukrainian folklorists
Ukrainian composers
Ukrainian rock singers
21st-century Ukrainian women singers
1988 births
People from Nizhyn
Living people